Nazan Kırılmış Kesal (born 28 March 1956) is a Turkish actress. In 2004, she worked as a director and actor in Diyarbakır State Theater. The artist who was appointed to Bursa State Theater in early 2004, also worked in private groups such as Ankara Sanatevi Theater, Theater Mirror, Theater Istanbul, Diyarbakir Art Center.

Theater 
 Yaralarım Aşktandır : Şebnem İşigüzel - 2019
 You Shall Give Me Grandsons : Thomas Jonigk - 2016
 Özgürlük Oyunu : Adam Atar - Bursa State Theater - 2010
 Karşılaşmalar : Can Utku - Bursa State Theater - 2009
 Hitit Sun : Turgay Nar - Bursa State Theater - 2005
 The House of Bernarda Alba : Federico Garcia Lorca - Bursa State Theater - 2004
 8 Mart Dünya Kadınlar Günü kutlamaları,  Diyarbakır Art Center - 2003
 Mikado'nun Çöpleri : Melih Cevdet Anday - Diyarbakır State Theater - 2002
 Deli Dumrul : Güngör Dilmen - Diyarbakır State Theater - 2001
 Peace : Aristophanes - Diyarbakır State Theater - 2001
 Gözlerimi Kaparım, Vazifemi Yaparım : Haldun Taner - Diyarbakır State Theater - 2000
 Şahmeran : Nazım Hikmet - Diyarbakır State Theater - 1999
 A Midsummer Night's Dream : William Shakespeare - Diyarbakır State Theater - 1999
 Yolcu : Nazım Hikmet - Diyarbakır State Theater - 1998
 It Runs in the Family : Ray Cooney - Diyarbakır State Theater - 1997
 Tartuffe : Moliere - Diyarbakır State Theater - 1997
 Burnunu Kaybeden Palyaço : Nil Banu Engindeniz - Diyarbakır State Theater - 1997
 Düdükçülerle Fırçacıların Savaşı  : Aziz Nesin - Diyarbakır State Theater - 1997
 Lily & Lily : Pierre Barillet - Theater İstanbul - 1996
 Ziyaretçi : Tuncer Cücenoğlu - Theater Ayna - 1995
 Rosa Lüksemburg : Rekin Teksoy - Theater Ayna - 1994
 Cam Bardaklar Kırılsın : Adem Atar - Ankara Art House - 1993

Filmography

Cinema 
 Nasipse Adayız - 2020 - Figen
 Kardeşim Benim - 2016
 Toz Bezi - Hatun
 Delibal - 2015
 Circle : Atıl İnaç - 2014
 Hair : Tayfun Pirselimoğlu - 2010
 Albatrosun Yolculuğu : Cengis Temuçin Asiltürk - 2010
 Vicdan : Erden Kıral - 2008
 Hüküm : L. Rezan Yeşilbaş - 2008
 İklimler : Nuri Bilge Ceylan - 2006 - Serap
 Uzak : Nuri Bilge Ceylan - 2002 - Serap 
 Yazgı : Zeki Demirkubuz - 2001 - Patron Kızı
 İstanbul Kanatlarımın Altında : Mustafa Altıoklar - 1996 - Fahişe
 Bir Sonbahar Hikayesi : Yavuz Özkan - 1994
 Kiralık Ev : 1994
 Waldo, Sen Neden Burda Değilsin : 1993
 Biri Aida Diğeri Zeliha : 1992
 Cazibe Hanımın Gündüz Düşleri : İrfan Tözüm - 1992 - Komşu Kadın
 Gölge Oyunu : Yavuz Turgul - 1992 - Sezen

TV series 
Bir Peri Masalı - (2022–) - Harika Köksal
Oğlum - 2022 - Canan
 Bir Zamanlar Çukurova - 2020–2021 - Sevda Çağlayan/Fatma Ozden
 Çocuk - 2019–2020 - Asiye Karasu
 Halka - 2019 - Hümeyra Karabulut
 Fazilet Hanım ve Kızları - 2017–2018 - Fazilet Çamkıran
 Analar ve Anneler - 2015 - Muazzez
 Bugünün Saraylısı: Kudret Sabancı - 2014 - Üftade
 Kayıp Şehir : Cevdet Mercan - 2012 - Meryem
 Bir Ömür Yetmez : İlksen Başarır - 2011 - Şükran
 Aşk ve Ceza : Kudret Sabancı - 2010 - Sevgi
 Hicran Yarası : Nursen Esenboğa - 2009 - Hicran
 Cennetin Çocukları : Faruk Teber  - 2008 - Mevlüde
 Şölen : Cemal Kavsar - 2007 - Süreyya
 Rüzgarlı Bahçe : Metin Günay - 2005 - Gülten
 Aliye : Kudret Sabancı - 2004 - Nermin
 Yadigar : Hakan Gürtop - 2004 - Kezban
 Mühürlü Güller : Hakan Gürtop - 2003 
 Berivan : Temel Gürsu - 2002
 Şara : Orhan Oğuz - 1999
 Bizim Aile : Kartal Tibet - 1995
 Öykülerle Yaşayanlar : Tülay Eratalay - 1994 - Dagır Dilsiz Kadın
 Tatlı Betüş : Atıf Yılmaz - 1993
 Süper Baba : Osman Sınav - 1993

Awards 
 2006 – 43rd Antalya Golden Orange Film Festival- Best Supporting Actress Award (İklimler)
 2011 – 30th International İstanbul Film Festival-Best Actress Award (Hair)
 2014 – 25th Ankara International Film Festival- Best Actress Award (Circle)

References

1969 births
Living people
Turkish film actresses
Turkish television actresses